Joonas Jalvanti (born 9 September 1988) is a Finnish professional ice hockey defenceman who is currently an unrestricted free agent. He most recently played for Lahti Pelicans in the Liiga.

Jalvanti formerly played two seasons in the SHL after joining Örebro HK from Finnish club, Espoo Blues of the Liiga on 10 April 2014.

References

External links

1988 births
Espoo Blues players
Finnish ice hockey defencemen
Jokerit players
Living people
Lahti Pelicans players
Sportspeople from Lahti
Luleå HF players
Örebro HK players